This is a list of Members of Parliament elected to the Parliament of the United Kingdom at the 1955 general election, held on 26 May 1955. A total of 630 MPs were elected.

Notable newcomers to the House of Commons included William Whitelaw and Geoffrey Rippon.

Composition
These representative diagrams show the composition of the parties in the 1955 general election.

Note: This is not the official seating plan of the House of Commons, which has five rows of benches on each side, with the government party to the right of the Speaker and opposition parties to the left, but with room for only around two-thirds of MPs to sit at any one time.

By-elections
See the list of United Kingdom by-elections.

See also
List of parliaments of the United Kingdom
UK general election, 1955
:Category:UK MPs 1955–1959

1955
1955 United Kingdom general election
 List
UK MPs